The following is a list of Saturn Award winners and nominees for Best Supporting Actor (in a film). Burgess Meredith, Ian McKellen and Andy Serkis are the only actors that have won the award twice, while only Javier Bardem, Heath Ledger, and Ke Huy Quan have won both the Saturn Award and the Academy Award for Best Supporting Actor for the same performance.

Winners and nominees

1970s

1980s

1990s

2000s

2010s

2020s

Multiple nominations
4 nominations
 Ian McKellen
 Alan Rickman
 Andy Serkis

3 nominations
 Harrison Ford
 John Lithgow
 Burgess Meredith
 Bill Nighy
 Bill Paxton
 Christopher Walken

2 nominations
 Javier Bardem
 Josh Brolin
 Jeffrey Combs
 Scatman Crothers
 Robert De Niro
 Adam Driver
 Robert Englund
 Ralph Fiennes
 John Goodman
 Tom Hardy
 Woody Harrelson
 Tom Hiddleston
 Michael Keaton
 Val Kilmer
 Walter Koenig
 Frank Langella
 Jude Law
 Christopher Lloyd
 John Malkovich
 Ian McDiarmid
 Roddy McDowall
 Alfred Molina
 Leonard Nimoy
 Gary Oldman
 Giovanni Ribisi
 Tim Roth
 Will Smith
 Brent Spiner
 Patrick Stewart
 Max von Sydow
 Stanley Tucci
 Christoph Waltz
 Billy Dee Williams
 Robin Williams

Multiple wins
2 wins
Ian McKellen
Burgess Meredith
Andy Serkis

External links
Official Site
Internet Movie Database: 3rd, 4th, 5th, 6th, 7th, 8th, 9th, 10th, 11th, 12th, 13th, 14th, 15th, 16th, 17th, 18th, 19th, 20th, 21st, 22nd, 23rd, 24th, 25th, 26th, 27th, 28th, 29th, 30th, 31st, 32nd, 33rd, 34th, 35th, 36th, 37th, 38th, 39th, 40th, 41st, 42nd, 43rd

Supporting Actor (Film)